Luis Horna Biscari (born 14 September 1980, in Lima) is a former tour professional tennis player from Peru, who turned professional in 1998. Known by his nickname "Lucho", he won 2 career singles titles, reached the quarterfinals of the 2004 Madrid Masters and achieved a career-high singles ranking of World No. 33 in August 2004.

Together with Pablo Cuevas, Horna also won the men's doubles at the 2008 French Open. At the 2003 French Open, he defeated Roger Federer in the first round.

Career

Juniors
Horna was an outstanding junior player, reaching as high as No. 4 in the world in singles 1997 (and No. 3 in doubles). He made the final of the boys singles at the French Open in 1997 losing to Daniel Elsner. Horna won the French Open and Wimbledon doubles with José de Armas and Nicolás Massú respectively.

1998–2001
Horna turned professional in 1998 and he moved up over 1,000 places in the rankings with victories in the Ecuadorian, where he defeated Sergio Roitman as a qualifier and three Futures events in Peru and in 1999 made his first ATP Challenger final in Aschaffenburg. In 2000 he was finalist in Salinas and again in Aschaffenburg and it was not until 2001 that Horna was able to get his first win on the ATP tour in Umag defeating Martin Damm. He also made another Challenger final in Curitiba losing to Flávio Saretta.

2002–2004
2002 was a successful year for Horna when he became the first Peruvian since Jaime Yzaga to finish in the top 100 in the end of season rankings, who finished 34th in 1994. This was achieved through winning three Challenger titles in Zagreb, Fürth, and Weiden defeating Dominik Hrbatý, Jürgen Melzer and Zeljko Krajan respectively and finalist in the São Paulo Challenger losing to Franco Squillari.

Horna made his debut in the four Grand Slam events in 2003. At the French Open, Horna defeated Roger Federer who was the fifth pre-tournament favourite and was the last time that Federer lost in the first round of a Grand Slam event. At the time Horna said after the victory that it was "the best feeling I have had in my whole life". Horna lost his second round match after having a match point against eventual finalist Martin Verkerk. He won another Challenger title in Seville and was a three time semi finalist in Amersfoort, Sopot and Palermo.

In 2004, Horna reached his career-high ranking of World No. 33, which was achieved on 30 August. Horna won the Bermuda Challenger over Martín Vassallo Argüello and made his first ATP final in Long Island losing to Lleyton Hewitt. Horna also made three semi finals at the Brasil Open, Houston and Munich. Horna finished inside the top 50 at the end of the year equalling the same feat by Jaime Yzaga.

2005–2006
2005 was not as successful for Horna and his singles ranking slipped to outside the top 50. He won his first doubles title with Argentine Martín García in Amersfoort and achieved his best ever performance at the French Open making the third round and defeating the seeded Tim Henman in the second round before losing to Victor Hănescu.

Despite Horna winning his first ever ATP singles title defeating Juan Ignacio Chela of Argentina 7–6(5), 6–4 in Acapulco. After winning the title he said "Acapulco will stay in my heart. I've had an unbelievable experience here,". "It's like being at home". As well as reaching the third round of the Australian Open for the first time defeating Gaël Monfils before losing to Paul-Henri Mathieu and winning his second doubles title with Martín García in Palermo. Horna finished 2006 ranked outside the top 50 and had various injury problems relating to his arm and shoulder which affected his final end-of-year ranking.

2007
Horna had an unfortunate start to 2007 by losing his first round match at the Australian Open to doubles' specialist Max Mirnyi, after being frustrated by the umpire's refusal to eject an abusive heckler in the fifth set. His concentration was disturbed by the calls of "Well done, Beast" (Max Mirnyi's nickname) and "C'mon, roadkill". In February of that year he won his second ATP singles title, defeating Nicolás Massú for the only time in 7 matches 7–5, 6–3 in Viña del Mar, Chile, without losing a set in the tournament. In September, Horna and Iván Miranda took the Peruvian team of Davis Cup to the World Group for the first time by beating Belarus in Lima 4–1.

2008
While Horna has only made one semi final in 2008 in Acapulco, he has won 3 doubles titles in Auckland with Juan Mónaco, in Buenos Aires with Agustín Calleri and the 2008 French Open with the Uruguayan Pablo Cuevas. The 2008 Australian Open started an unusual sequence for Horna, in which he played against his sometime doubles partner and friend Agustín Calleri in his first four tournaments of the year in addition to the Australian Open, the others were Viña del Mar, Buenos Aires and Acapulco. This sequence was broken by Horna's elbow injury that caused him to withdraw from Costa do Sauipe.

The highlight of 2008 was the unexpected win in the 2008 French Open men's doubles crown, partnering Uruguayan Pablo Cuevas, the duo became the first all-South American doubles team to win a Grand Slam title. It was a surprise that Cuevas said "We were not expecting to go that far." Horna and Cuevas were unseeded and defeated four seeded teams starting with Michaël Llodra and Arnaud Clément in the first round, Leander Paes and Lukáš Dlouhý in the third round. In the quarter finals they defeated the No. 1 ranked team Bob and Mike Bryan and in the final defeated the No. 2 seeded team of Nenad Zimonjić and Daniel Nestor. The trophy was presented by Andrés Gómez Horna said that "Gomez has been like an idol for us Peruvians,". "To have a trophy from him is, I think, one of the important moments in my professional career."

While having doubles success, Horna struggled in his singles and finished outside the top 100 since 2001. He won the Lugano Challenger without losing a set defeating Nicolas Devilder in the final.

Horna and Cuevas by virtue of winning Roland Garros had qualified for the Tennis Masters Cup doubles where they made the semi finals losing to Nenad Zimonjić and Daniel Nestor, by finishing second in their round robin group behind Bob and Mike Bryan.

Horna became the first player from Peru to win a Grand Slam title in the professional era. The Peruvian Alejandro Olmedo won two before the Open era, Wimbledon and Melbourne (Australian Open) in 1959 but representing the United States.

2009 was Horna's last season on tour, and played his final tournament at Lima Challenger, where he lost in the second round to Chilean Jorge Aguilar.

Playing style
Horna plays right-handed, he has a strong serve for a relatively short player and the forehand is his best stroke. He uses a single-handed backhand and his favourite surface is clay.

Miscellaneous
 He previously shared coach Francisco Mastelli with Juan Mónaco and Mastelli was the former coach of current Argentine Davis cup captain Alberto Mancini.
 Horna is currently the Peruvian Davis Cup captain.

Grand Slam finals

Doubles: 1 (1–0)

ATP career finals

Singles: 3 (2 titles, 1 runner-up)

Doubles: 11 (6 titles, 5 runner-ups)

ATP Challenger and ITF Futures Finals

Singles: 15 (10–5)

Doubles: 16 (7–9)

Performance timelines

Singles

Doubles

Top 10 wins

Junior Grand Slam finals

Singles: 1 (1 runner-up)

Doubles: 2 (2 titles)

References

External links

 
 
 
 Horna World Ranking History

1980 births
Living people
French Open champions
French Open junior champions
Olympic tennis players of Peru
Sportspeople from Lima
Peruvian male tennis players
Peruvian people of Italian descent
Tennis players at the 2004 Summer Olympics
Wimbledon junior champions
Grand Slam (tennis) champions in men's doubles
Grand Slam (tennis) champions in boys' doubles